Central Germany (Mitteldeutschland or Zentraldeutschland) may refer to:

 Central Germany (linguistics) is the region where the Central German dialects are spoken
 Central Germany (geography) describes the regions in the geographic center of Germany
 Central Germany (cultural area) (in German, Mitteldeutschland) is the economic and cultural identity of a region in Germany. The name dates back to the 19th century, when the area was in a roughly central location in the German Empire